John Carpenter (1399–1476) was an English bishop, provost, and university chancellor.

Early life 
Carpenter's father was John Carpenter the elder, born around 1362 to Richard or Renaud Carpenter of Cambrai and his wife Christina of London. John Carpenter the bishop was also known as John Carpenter the elder. He had three siblings, Margery, John the younger, and William. His two brothers were baptised in Hereford. He was baptised on 4 May 1399 in St Peter's Church, Westbury on Trym, Bristol, England. He had a notable uncle also called John Carpenter, town clerk of London.

According to Douglas-Smith, Carpenter was Warden of St. Anthony's Hospital, London and Rector of St. Mary Magdalen. A Master John Carpenter, then King's clerk, is referred to in Patent Rolls of 17 March 1433 and 9 July 1435, the first being a grant for life of the wardenship. John Carpenter, bishop of Worcester, appears as a plaintiff in the Plea Rolls of the Common Pleas, in 1450, and is also described as the warden of the Hospital of St Anthony.

Bishop and chancellor
Carpenter was Provost of Oriel College, Oxford, from 1428 to 1444, and Chancellor of the University of Oxford in 1437. Carpenter was nominated on 20 December 1443 and consecrated as Bishop of Worcester on 22 March 1444. He resigned the see in July 1476. Carpenter died in 1476 in Northwick, Worcestershire, England, and was buried in Westbury on Trym.

Church at Westbury on Trym 
Carpenter was buried at Holy Trinity Church, Westbury on Trym, in 1476. He had been baptised at the same church, which at that time was dedicated to St Peter and St Paul. Soon after Carpenter became bishop he sought to raise the status of St Peter's to that of a joint cathedral with Worcester, and styled himself "Bishop of Worcester and Westbury". He had the building rededicated to the Holy Trinity. Carpenter added a chancel, and a chapel dedicated to St Oswald, to the fabric. He also refounded and rebuilt Westbury College.

Carpenter was buried in the crypt underneath the altar. His memorial was originally a cadaver tomb, with the bishop in full episcopal attire above an enclosure containing a sculpture of a cadaver or skeleton. This tomb was broken up in 1646, during the Civil War, by soldiers from the Bristol garrison. In 1851 the stone cadaver was found in the crypt of the chapel. This was incorporated in 1853 into a new canopied memorial of Purbeck marble, marked on top with a bishop's crozier. Over the porch entrance doorway is a statue of Bishop Carpenter, of unknown date. At some time headless, the statue was restored in the early 20th century.

References

Further reading
 Powicke, F. Maurice and E. B. Fryde Handbook of British Chronology 2nd. ed. London:Royal Historical Society 1961
 Peasants And Landlords In Later Medieval England by Fryde, 1996. There is major material on Bishop John Carpenter within. The author says that, "He appears to have come from Westbury near Bristol and to have descended from a family of Episcopal tenants there." (p. 169)
 Lords and Peasants in a Changing Society: The Estates of the Bishopric of Worcester, 680–1540, Cambridge, 1980. by Dyer.
 Burton, Edwin. "Ancient Diocese of Worcester". The Catholic Encyclopedia. Vol. 15. New York: Robert Appleton Company, 1912. 23 April 2009.

External links
 Alvechurch where Bishop Carpenter resided.
  Bishop Carpenter's Injunctions to the Diocese of Worcester in 1451. From: Historical Research – Volume 40, Issue 102, pages 203–207, November 1967.
 Aspects of the Episcopate of John Carpenter, Bishop of Worcester 1444–1476. By Roy M. Haines, Associate Professor of History, Dalhousie University, Halifax, Nova Scotia. From: The Journal of Ecclesiastical History April 1968 19 : pp 11–40, Cambridge University Press 1968.  – Published online: March 2011.

1399 births
1476 deaths
People from Gloucestershire
People from Westbury-on-Trym
Bishops of Worcester
Provosts of Oriel College, Oxford
Chancellors of the University of Oxford
15th-century English Roman Catholic bishops